Jalen Wydermyer (born December 20, 2000) is an American football tight end for the Indianapolis Colts of the National Football League (NFL). He played college football at Texas A&M, where he was a three-time all-SEC second-team selection.

Early life and high school career
Wydermyer grew up in Dickinson, Texas and attended Dickinson High School. As senior, he caught 42 passes for 875 yards with 10 touchdowns. Rated a four star recruit, Wydermyer committed to play college football at Texas A&M over Miami.

College career
As a freshman Wydermyer had larger role in Texas A&M's offense than originally expected after fellow freshman Baylor Cupp suffered a season ending injury towards the end of training camp. Wydermyer finished the season with 32 catches for 447 yards and six touchdowns and was named the Southeastern Conference (SEC) All-Freshman team and second-team All-SEC by the Associated Press. Wydermyer was named preseason All-SEC and to the Mackey Award watchlist going into his sophomore season. Wydermyer received second-team all-SEC honors in 2020.

During the 2021 season, Wydermyer recorded 40 receptions for 515 yards. He was named a finalist for the John Mackey Award for the second time, but the 2021 award was ultimately given to Trey McBride.

Wydermyer decided to forgo his final year of eligibility to enter the 2022 NFL Draft. He holds the school record among tight ends in career receptions, receiving yards and touchdown catches.

Professional career

Buffalo Bills
Wydermyer signed with the Buffalo Bills as an undrafted free agent on May 13, 2022. He was waived on August 14, 2022.

New England Patriots
Wydermyer signed with the New England Patriots on August 18, 2022. He was waived on August 30, 2022, and signed to the practice squad the next day. He was released on September 20.

Indianapolis Colts
Wydermyer was signed to the Indianapolis Colts practice squad on October 17, 2022.

References

External links
Indianapolis Colts bio
Texas A&M Aggies bio

2000 births
Living people
People from Dickinson, Texas
Players of American football from Texas
Sportspeople from the Houston metropolitan area
American football tight ends
Texas A&M Aggies football players
Buffalo Bills players
New England Patriots players
Indianapolis Colts players